Murphey Lake may refer to:
Murphy Lake (Newaygo County, Michigan)
Rollway Lake

See also
Murphy Lake (disambiguation)